is a Japanese model and beauty queen who was crowned Miss Universe 1959, making her the first Japanese and Asian woman to win the title.

Biography
Kojima was a 22-year-old model from Tokyo, Japan when she bested four other finalists from Norway, the US, England, and Brazil for the 1959 Miss Universe crown in Long Beach, California. At 5 ft 6 in (167.6 cm), Akiko measured 37–23–38 inches (94.0–58.4–96.5 cm). She denied press reports on having undergone breast surgery. A year later in 1960, Akiko crowned her successor, Miss Universe 1960, Linda Bement from the United States.

In 1966, Kojima was married to Japanese actor Akira Takarada, who rose to fame in the Toho movie studios doing the Godzilla movies since 1954. Kojima settled into a quiet married life. They later had a daughter, Michiru Kojima, in 1967.  They divorced in 1984 and Kojima left with their daughter.

Forty eight years later after her reign, another Japanese national, Riyo Mori, won the Miss Universe pageant in 2007.

References

1936 births
Japanese beauty pageant winners
Japanese female models
Living people
Miss Universe 1959 contestants
Miss Universe winners